The 2023 CFL season is scheduled to be the 69th season of modern professional Canadian football. Officially, it will be the 65th season of the Canadian Football League. Hamilton is scheduled to host the 110th Grey Cup on November 19, 2023. The regular season will start on June 8, 2023 and it will end on October 28, 2023.

CFL news in 2023

Salary cap
According to the new collective bargaining agreement, the 2023 salary cap will be set at $5,510,000. As per the agreement, the cap is fixed and will not vary with league revenue performance. The minimum player salary will be set at $70,000 after previously being $65,000 for National and American players and $54,000 for Global players in 2022.

Starter ratio
Beginning this season, teams will be required to start eight National players as opposed to just seven in years prior. However, one of those players can be a "Nationalized American" player that has spent three years with the same team or five years in the CFL. Teams can also have one more Nationalized American on offence and one on defence substitute up to 49% of the snaps for a National player.

Scheduling
During the commissioner's state of the league address on November 18, 2022, it was announced that the playoff games (Division Semi-Final and Division Final games) would be moved from Sundays to Saturdays while the 110th Grey Cup game would remain on Sunday. It will be the first time that the playoffs were held on Saturdays since the 2008 CFL season. The Touchdown Atlantic series continues with the Toronto Argonauts hosting the Saskatchewan Roughriders at Huskies Stadium (Saint Mary’s University) in Halifax, Nova Scotia on Saturday, July 29, 2023. This will be the first regular season game held in Halifax after the city hosted a pre-season match in 2005. 

In the most recent collective bargaining agreement, the league had the option of moving this season's schedule by up to 30 days earlier. However, the league decided to keep the dates consistent with previous years when the 2023 schedule was released on December 13, 2022, and it was revealed that the season opening game would take place on June 8, 2023.

Coaching changes

Player movement

Free agency
The 2023 free agency period officially began on Tuesday, February 14, 2023, at 12:00 p.m. ET. Pending free agents and teams were able to negotiate offers for one week starting Sunday, February 5, 2023, and ending Sunday, February 12, 2023. All formal offers to a player during this time were sent to both the league and the players union and could not be rescinded.

Broadcasting
The CFL will continue to be broadcast on TSN and RDS across all platforms in Canada as part of their current contract. The broadcast rights are reported to have been extended through 2025.

References

Canadian Football League seasons
2023 in Canadian football